Beatites is a genus of Lower Triassic ammonites characterized by a somewhat strongly involute and greatly compressed shell with a sharp, oxyconic, venter. Beatites was first found in Albania and is assigned to the ceratatiid family Hedenstroemiidae.

References 

 Arkell, W.J, et al, 1957. Treatise on Invertebrate Paleontology; Geological Society of America and University of Kansas Press. 
 List of Cephalopod genera, J.J. Sepkoski. 

Hedenstroemiidae
Ceratitida genera
Triassic ammonites